Andrew Ian Cooper FRS is Professor of Chemistry in the Department of Chemistry at the University of Liverpool.

Education
Cooper was educated at the University of Nottingham where he was awarded a PhD for research supervised by Martyn Poliakoff.

Career
After his PhD, Cooper held a number of postdoctoral research positions. He is an 1851 Research Fellowship and a Royal Society NATO Research Fellowship at the University of North Carolina at Chapel Hill where he worked with Joseph DeSimone. He then held a Ramsay Memorial Research Fellowship at the Melville Laboratory for Polymer Synthesis at the University of Cambridge, working with Andrew Bruce Holmes. He moved to the University of Liverpool in 1999 where he has worked ever since.

Awards and honours
Cooper was elected a Fellow of the Royal Society (FRS) in 2015. His nomination reads: 

2019 Awarded the Hughes Medal of the Royal Society.

References

External links

Living people
Year of birth missing (living people)
Date of birth missing (living people)
Place of birth missing (living people)
British chemists
Fellows of the Royal Society